Friedrich Linde may refer to:

 Fedor Linde, Russian revolutionary
 Friedrich Linde, general manager or general director of Linde plc in 1935
 Friedrich Linde, 19th century German composer